Leptosia wigginsi, the opaque wood white or opaque spirit, is a butterfly in the family Pieridae. It is found in Senegal, Sierra Leone, Liberia, Ivory Coast, Ghana, Togo, Benin, Nigeria, Cameroon, the Central African Republic, the Democratic Republic of the Congo, Uganda, Kenya and Tanzania. The habitat consists of primary lowland forests.

The larvae feed on Capparis species.

Subspecies
Leptosia wigginsi wigginsi – (eastern Democratic Republic of Congo, Uganda, south-western Kenya, western Tanzania)
Leptosia wigginsi pseudalcesta Bernardi, 1965 – (Senegal, Sierra Leone, Liberia, Ivory Coast, Ghana, Togo, Benin, Nigeria, Cameroon, Central African Republic, Democratic Republic of the Congo)

References

Butterflies described in 1915
wigginsi